South China Mall in Dongguan, China (formerly New South China Mall) is the third largest shopping mall in the world when measured in terms of gross leasable area, and third in terms of total area to after Iran Mall (which has extensive non-shopping space including a musical fountain, food court, mosque and hotel).

South China Mall opened in 2005 and for more than 10 years it was mostly vacant as few merchants ever signed up, leading it to be dubbed a dead mall. In 2015 a CNN story reported that large parts of the mall were "full of shops, restaurants and entertainment venues" after extensive renovations and remodeling, though large portions of the mall still remained vacant. But CNN also added that most of the those unoccupied units, in addition to halls and walkways, were still under renovation. According to another article published in January 2018, after more than a decade of high vacancy, most retail spaces were expected to be filled soon, and the mall featured an IMAX-style cinema and theme park.

The mall was built on former farmlands in the Wanjiang District of Dongguan in southern coastal China. The project was spearheaded by Hu Guirong (Alex Hu), who became a billionaire in the instant noodle industry. Upon opening, South China Mall became the largest mall in the world, surpassing the Golden Resources Mall. The cost of its construction is estimated around $1.3 billion.

The mall was owned by Dongguan Sanyuan Yinghui Investment & Development, Hu Guirong's company, but a controlling interest in the mall was later sold to Founder Group, a division of Peking University.

After opening in 2005, the mall suffered from a severe lack of occupants. Targeted initially to an affluent market (the big cities of Guangzhou and Shenzhen are adjacent), Dongguan is itself mainly a city of low income migrant laborers who failed to respond to all the attractions the mall had to offer. Much of the retail space remained empty, with over 99% of the stores still vacant in 2008. The only occupied areas were near the entrance where several Western fast food chains are located and a parking structure re-purposed as a kart racing track. A planned Shangri-La Hotel was not completed.

Filmmaker Sam Green made a short film about the South China Mall called Utopia Part 3: the World's Largest Shopping Mall which premiered at the 2009 Sundance Film Festival and was broadcast on PBS's documentary series POV.

Originally called "South China Mall", the centre was redubbed as  "New South China Mall, Living City" in September 2007. The 2007 makeover was orchestrated by Founder Group, which took over the property from the original owner Hu Guirong in December 2006.

In 2013, Vagabond Journey writer Wade Shepard wrote about his recent visit to the mall. He acknowledged that most visitors attend the mall for its movie theaters featuring IMAX, and that families did gather in the play area. He also noticed that 4 full floors of the mall were unused, and that the water of the artificial indoor canals had turned green.

Description 

The mall has seven zones modeled on international cities, nations and regions, including Amsterdam, Paris, Rome, Venice, Egypt, the Caribbean, and California.  Features include a  replica of the Arc de Triomphe, a replica of Venice's St Mark's bell tower, a  canal with gondolas.

See also
List of the world's largest shopping malls
List of shopping malls in China

References

External links

Official website
Utopia, Part 3, PBS documentary on South China Mall, August 18, 2009. Note: this documentary is actively filtered to prevent non-US visitors from accessing the content.

Shopping malls in China
Shopping malls established in 2005
2005 establishments in China
Buildings and structures in Dongguan